Hakala is a Finnish surname. Notable people with the surname include:

 Aki Hakala (born 1979), Finnish drummer
 Aleksi Hakala (1886–1959), Finnish politician
 Antti Hakala (born 1978), Finnish musician known by his stage name Nopsajalka
 Jarmo Hakala (born 1954), Finnish canoeist
 Jukka Hakala (born 1977), Finnish footballer
 Jyrki Hakala (born 1960), Finnish canoeist
 Marita Hakala, Finnish model
 Tommi Hakala (born 1970), Finnish opera singer
 Tuomo Hakala (born 1957), Finnish footballer
 Vesa Hakala (born 1968), Finnish ski jumper
 Yrjö Hakala (born 1932), Finnish ice hockey player

See also 
 Nihad Fetić Hakala, Bosnian singer

Finnish-language surnames